So Good is the second studio album and the first international album by Swedish singer Zara Larsson, released on 17 March 2017 through TEN Music Group and Epic Records. Scheduled to be released in May 2016 and then again, in January 2017, the album was delayed to change and update several tracks.

Background and composition

The record features songs primarily in a pop style, as well as several rhythmic and dance songs, and several ballads. It also incorporates R&B and tropical house influences.

In a late 2015 interview with Idolator, Larsson confirmed she worked with Dr. Luke. However, his work did not make the final cut of the album. During an interview with Billboard, Larsson confirmed she worked with Max Martin's team on the project, saying: "I worked with so many. Me and MNEK have done a lot of other songs. Me and the Max Martin team. Not Max Martin himself, but hopefully next time. The team is really good. The Monsters & Strangerz, I love them so much. And just a lot of super talented people—R. City, Justin Tranter, so many good people. Whoever you meet, they're like, 'I just wrote a No. 1 for this or that.' Everyone has something to brag about, which is what I would do if I wrote that good songs." Larsson also worked with Stargate and Charlie Puth. During an interview with Digital Spy, Zara confirmed that every song on the album was written and produced by a different production team. After several delays, Larsson finally shared the artwork of the album on her social media on 3 February 2017, and was made available for pre-order that day, revealing the release date of 17 March 2017.

Singles
Larsson released lead single "Lush Life" on 4 June 2015 in Sweden and on 9 June 2015 worldwide. Two music videos were released for the song—one directed by Måns Nyman and another directed by Mary Clerté. It was a worldwide success, reaching the top 10 in several countries including the United Kingdom, Australia, Germany and Spain.

On 22 July 2015, "Never Forget You" was released in the United Kingdom as a digital download. A music video, directed by Richard Paris Wilson, was released on 17 September 2015. The song reached the top 10 in several countries, including the United Kingdom, Sweden, Denmark and Finland, and became both Larsson and MNEK's first US entry, peaking at number 13 in May 2016. The single was certified 4× Platinum in Sweden and 2× Platinum in the US.

On 2 September 2016, "Ain't My Fault" was released as the third single from the album. Its official music video, directed by Emil Nava, was premiered via Larsson's Vevo account on 30 September 2016. It reached the top 20 in Australia, United Kingdom, Finland and Denmark among others, peaking at number one in Sweden.

On 11 November 2016, "I Would Like" was released as a promotional single, and later released as an official single for the United Kingdom due to overwhelming support from the country. Larsson performed the song on the thirteenth series of The X Factor UK on 4 December 2016. The song reached the top 10 in several countries, including the United Kingdom and Ireland.

On 27 January 2017, the title track "So Good" featuring Ty Dolla $ign was released as the fifth single from the album. The official music video for the song, directed by Sarah McColgan, premiered on 3 February 2017, via Larsson's Vevo channel. They performed the song on The Ellen DeGeneres Show on 7 February 2017 and on The Wendy Williams Show on 23 March 2017. It reached the top 10 on the Sverigetopplistan in Sweden, where it was certified Gold and reached number seven.

On 17 March 2017, "Symphony", by Clean Bandit featuring Larsson, was released as the a bonus track from the album, as well as the third single from Clean Bandit's upcoming second album. The music video, directed by Clean Bandit's members Grace Chatto and Jack Patterson, premiered the same day. They gave the first live performance of the song on The Voice UK on 18 March 2017. The song reached the top 10 of countries like Australia, Finland, Germany and Ireland, and also reached the number one position in Norway, the United Kingdom, Scotland and Sweden. As well as becoming Larsson's fifth number one in her home country, it also gave Larsson her first number one single in the UK.

On 12 May 2017, "Don't Let Me Be Yours", a song written by Ed Sheeran, was released as a single in the United Kingdom and later on promoted in Australia. The official music video was released on the same day. The song reached the top 40 in her home country of Sweden during the week of her album's debut on the chart.

On 11 August 2017, "Only You", was released as the seventh and final single from the album, promoted in Francophone countries with a remix from Canadian singer Olivier Dion, and in German speaking countries with a version featuring German icon Nena. The song reached the top five in Sweden and the top 40 in Norway.

Critical reception

On Metacritic, the album received a score of 76 out of 100 based on four reviews, indicating "generally favorable" reception. Harriet Gibsone of The Guardian gave the album a three-star rating out of five, describing the album as "sugar-soaked postmodern pop", saying Larsson is like a "Rihanna-doting teen gatecrashing a tropical house party, gun fingers blazing, and her sugar-soaked songs are imbued with honesty". Gibsone also mentioned how, at a time when pop looks to the future, 'So Good' is in danger of dying quickly". Nick Levine from NME gave the album four stars out of five, saying how the "big hits you know are obviously brilliant", but describing some of the "ballads towards the end" as "dull".

Track listing

Notes
  signifies an additional producer
  signifies a co-producer

Sample credits
"I Would Like" contains a portion of the composition of "Dat Sexy Body", written by Sasha and Anthony Kelly.

Personnel
Credits adapted from AllMusic.

 James Abrahart – backing vocals
 Astma & Rocwell – engineering, production
 Chris Athens – mastering
 Fred Ball – engineering, instrumentation, production
 Andy Barnes – vocal engineering
 Stephanie Benedetti – violin
 Joakim Berg – guitar
 Ajay Bhattacharyya – drum programming, keyboard programming, vocals
 Anita Marisa Boriboon – creative direction
 James Boyd – viola
 Grace Chatto – cello
 Clean Bandit – production
 Rob Cohen – engineering
 Matt Colton – mastering
 DannyBoyStyles – production
 Björn Engelmann – mastering
 Tom Fuller – engineering assistance
 Brian "Peoples" Garcia – production
 Serban Ghenea – mixing
 Jason Gill – engineering, instrumentation, production, programming

 Ola Håkansson – executive production
 John Hanes – mix engineering
 Jerker Hansson – backing vocals
 Maria Hazell – backing vocals
 John Hill – drum programming, keyboard programming, production, vocals
 Garrett Hilliker – art direction, design
 Dave Huffman – mastering
 Stefan Johnson – engineering
 Kid Joki – production
 Kirsten Joy – backing vocals
 Rob Kinelski – mixing
 Zara Larsson – vocals, backing vocals
 Chris Laws – drums, engineering
 Marcus Lomax – backing vocals
 M-Phazes – piano, synthesizer
 Steve Mac – keyboards, piano, production
 Erik Madrid – mixing
 Michelle Mancini – mastering
 Maria P. Marulanda – art direction
 MNEK – drums, engineer, keyboards, production, vocals
 The Monsters & Strangerz – engineering, production

 Liam Nolan – string engineering
 Jesper Nordenström – grand piano
 Jack Patterson – mixing, piano, synthesizer
 Luke Patterson – percussion
 Phil Paul – production
 Beatrice Philips – violin
 Dann Pursey – engineering
 Charlie Puth – production
 Mark Ralph – mixing
 Marc Regas – photography
 Bart Schoudel – vocal engineering, vocal production
 Ed Sheeran – backing vocals, guitar
 Shuko – mixing, production
 Drew Smith – engineering assistance
 Linnea Sodahl – backing vocals
 Mike Spencer – additional production, mixing, programming
 Phil Tan – mixing
 Tross – bass, backing vocals, engineering, keyboards, percussion, piano, production, programming, vocal engineering, vocal production
 Ty Dolla $ign – vocals
 Wizkid – vocals
 Bill Zimmerman – engineering

Charts

Weekly charts

Year-end charts

Certifications

Release history

References

Notes

2017 albums
Zara Larsson albums
TEN Music Group albums
Epic Records albums
Albums produced by David Guetta
Albums produced by Fred Ball (producer)
Albums produced by Jason Gill (musician)
Albums produced by John Hill (record producer)
Albums produced by MNEK
Albums produced by Stargate
Albums produced by Steve Mac
Albums produced by Stint (producer)